Trader Hornee is a 1970 sexploitation film and directed by Jonathan Lucas and starring Buddy Pantsari, Elisabeth Monica, John Alderman, and Christine Murray, and Deek Sills. Written and produced by David F. Friedman, it is an adult-oriented parody of the vintage safari movie Trader Horn (1931).

In 1977, the Adult Film Association of America gave it a retroactive award of merit at its 1977 Erotica Awards as the movie considered to be the best adult film of 1966 to 1970.

Premise
Detective Hamilton Hornee and his team organize an expedition into mysterious Africa to search for Algona, heiress to her father's fortune. Algona happens to have become a magnificent blonde elephant-riding goddess worshiped by the frightened tribe of the Meshpokas.

Notes

External links 
 
 
 
 Trader Hornee at the AFI Catalog of Feature Films

American sexploitation films
1970s sex comedy films
1970 comedy films
1970 films
American sex comedy films
1970s English-language films
1970s American films